M-125 is a  state trunkline highway in the US state of Michigan. M-125 runs through rural farmlands and connects a couple of smaller towns with Monroe. It has an unsigned connector highway that links the main highway with Interstate 75 (I-75).

The highway is a section of the former Dixie Highway and US 25 in the state. It was first added to the state highway system in 1926 and given its current number in 1973. Previously there were two other highways that carried the M-125 moniker. One in the 1930s ran through the Upper Peninsula near Thompson and a second from 1938 until the mid-1950s was located in Bay County. The current designation was created in 1973 when US 25 was decommissioned in Michigan. The section in downtown Monroe was named what is now a Pure Michigan Byway in 1995.

Route description
M-125 starts at the state line as the continuation of Detroit Avenue running northward from Toledo. Once across the state line, the roadway takes on the Dixie Highway name and passes a residential subdivision. The highway runs north-northeasterly roughly parallel with, and between, both US 24 and I-75 through farm land in rural Monroe County. The trunkline passes through the community of Erie before intersecting with Conn. M-125 (Summit Street) north of town. That unsigned connector is a state highway that links M-125 with I-75 to the south. Continuing north, M-125 intersects Luna Pier Road, which to the west is the unsigned Conn. US 24 that offers a path to US 24 (Telegraph Road).

The route of M-125 changes direction slightly as it passes through the community of LaSalle; north of town it follows a more northeasterly course. The roadway passes through residential areas north of town as it approaches Monroe. South of the city, M-125 crosses the La Plaisance Creek and turns north-northwesterly through South Monroe. North of Lake Monroe, the road name changes from Dixie Highway to Monroe Street. The highway is the main street of the downtown area as it crosses the River Raisin upstream from the River Raisin National Battlefield Park. M-125 exits town near The Mall of Monroe.

M-125 is maintained by the Michigan Department of Transportation (MDOT) like other state highways in Michigan. As a part of these maintenance responsibilities, the department tracks the volume of traffic that uses the roadways under its jurisdiction. These volumes are expressed using a metric called annual average daily traffic, which is a statistical calculation of the average daily number of vehicles on a segment of roadway. MDOT's surveys in 2011 showed that the highest traffic levels along M-125 were the 21,229 vehicles daily between Jones and Front streets in Monroe; the lowest counts were the 2,306 vehicles per day between Sterns and Erie roads near Erie. No section of M-125 has been listed on the National Highway System, a network of roads important to the country's economy, defense, and mobility.

History

Previous designations
M-125 was first designated on a road in the Upper Peninsula from US 2 to north of Thompson in 1931; this roadway was later merged into M-149 in 1936 after a rerouting of US 2 through the area. The highway intersected US 23 between Kawkawlin and Linwood and ran westward to 7 Mile Road. It was completed as a gravel road in 1939, and paved by 1945. The second M-125 was transferred back to local control in late 1956 or early 1957.

Current designation
The Dixie Highway was conceived in 1915 to connect Chicago to Miami and commemorate a half-century since the end of the Civil War. On the suggestion of Governor Woodbridge N. Ferris, representatives from Michigan convinced the Dixie Highway Association to include Michigan in the proposed auto trail. Two divisions through the Lower Peninsula were included, the eastern one included a route between Detroit and Toledo via Monroe. This section of the Dixie Highway in Monroe County was first added to the state highway system in 1926 when US 25 was created. The highway was rerouted through downtown Monroe in the early 1930s; instead of turning westward in downtown to connect to Telegraph Road, the highway instead continued northward to the current Dixie Highway–Telegraph Road intersection. When the US 25 designation was decommissioned in the state in 1973, the highway segment between the state line and the Monroe area was given the M-125 designation. The routing has remained unchanged since. In 1995, the section through downtown Monroe was named what is now a Pure Michigan Byway.

Major intersections

See also

References

External links

M-125 at Michigan Highways
Conn. M-125 as a part of the Conn. US 24 listing at Michigan Highways

125
Dixie Highway
Transportation in Monroe County, Michigan
U.S. Route 25